Laack is a surname. Notable people with the surname include:

Charles A. Laack (1871–1957), American businessman and politician
Galen Laack (1931–1958), American football player

See also
Hotel Laack, NRHP-listed building in Plymouth, Wisconsin named for H.C. Laack
Lack (surname)